The 348th Reconnaissance Squadron is an active United States Air Force squadron, assigned to the 319th Operations Group. It was activated at Grand Forks Air Force Base, North Dakota on 19 September 2011. It currently operates the RQ-4 Global Hawk, High Altitude Intelligence, Surveillance, and Reconnaissance (HAISR) Remotely Piloted Aircraft (RPA).

During World War II, the 348th Bombardment Squadron was a Boeing B-17 Flying Fortress squadron, assigned to the 99th Bombardment Group of Fifteenth Air Force. It earned two Distinguished Unit Citations.

History

World War II
It was established in early 1942 as a Boeing B-17 Flying Fortress heavy bombardment squadron. It trained under Second Air Force first in the Pacific Northwest, but the poor flying weather in the northwest forced a relocation to the Midwest for the second and third phases of training.

After completion of training, the squadron departed for the Mediterranean Theater of Operations in Algeria, where the ground echelon went by ship from New York City to Marrakech, Morocco. The air echelon flew to Morrison Field, Florida then along the South Atlantic Route to Navarin Airfield, Algeria, where the ground and air echelons of the squadron were reunited in late February 1943. Assigned to Twelfth Air Force, the squadron engaged in combat operations in support of American ground forces in Algeria and Tunisia during the 1943 North African campaign.

The squadron helped force the capitulation of Pantelleria Island in June 1943, and bombed in preparation for and in support of the invasions of Sicily and southern Italy in the summer and fall of 1943. The squadron was reassigned to the new Fifteenth Air Force in October 1943, and, until the German capitulation in May 1945, engaged in strategic bombardment of enemy targets in Italy, France, Germany, Czechoslovakia, Austria, Hungary, Romania, Bulgaria, Yugoslavia, and Greece. It attacked oil refineries, marshaling yards, aircraft factories, and other strategic objectives. The squadron was demobilized in Italy in late 1945, and was inactivated in November.

Air Force reserve
Although activated in the reserves in 1947, the unit was never fully equipped or manned, and was inactivated in 1949 due to budget restraints.

Strategic Air Command
The squadron was reactivated in January 1953 at Fairchild Air Force Base, Washington, when the 111th Strategic Reconnaissance Wing, an Air National Guard unit that had been mobilized for the Korean War, was returned to state control. The squadron assumed the mission, personnel, and Convair RB-36 Peacemaker strategic reconnaissance aircraft of the 111th Wing's 130th Strategic Reconnaissance Squadron, a regular unit assigned to the 111th Wing, which was simultaneously inactivated. The squardon engaged in worldwide strategic bombardment training and stood nuclear alert until 1956 when the B-36 was retired.

The squadron was re-equipped with Boeing B-52 Stratofortresses and continued training and nuclear alert status. It deployed aircrews and aircraft to the Pacific during the Vietnam War, engaging in Operation Arc Light combat missions over North Vietnam; also deployed aircraft and personnel to Thailand flying out of U-Tapao Royal Thai Navy Airfield for combat missions over Cambodia and Laos. It was inactivated in 1973 with the draw down of its parent 99th Bombardment Wing in anticipation of the transfer of Westover Air Force Base to the Air Force Reserve.

Air Combat Command
The squadron was reactivated under the 69th Reconnaissance Group in September 2011 as an RQ-4 Global Hawk Squadron. The squadron became part of the 319th Operations group with the inactivation of the 69th Reconnaissance Group in June 2019.

Lineage
 Constituted as the 348th Bombardment Squadron (Heavy) on 28 January 1942
 Activated on 1 June 1942
 Redesignated 348th Bombardment Squadron, Heavy on 30 September 1944
 Inactivated on 8 November 1945
 Redesignated 348th Bombardment Squadron, Very Heavy on 13 May 1947
 Activated in the reserve on 29 May 1947
 Inactivated on 27 June 1949
 Redesignated 348th Strategic Reconnaissance Squadron, Heavy and activated on 1 January 1953
 Redesignated 348th Bombardment Squadron, Heavy on 1 October 1955
 Inactivated on 31 March 1974
 Redesignated 348th Reconnaissance Squadron on 17 August 2011
 Activated on 19 September 2011

Assignments
 99th Bombardment Group, 1 June 1942 – 8 November 1945
 99th Bombardment Group, 29 May 1947 – 27 June 1949
 99th Strategic Reconnaissance Wing (later 99th Bombardment Wing), 1 January 1953 – 30 September 1973
 69th Reconnaissance Group, 11 September 2011 – 27 June 2019
319th Operations Group, 28 June 2019 – present

Stations

 Orlando Army Air Base, Florida, 1 June 1942
 MacDill Field, Florida, 1 June 1942
 Pendleton Field, Oregon, 29 June 1942
 Gowen Field, Idaho, 28 August 1942
 Walla Walla Army Air Field, Washington, 30 September 1942
 Sioux City Army Air Base, Iowa, 17 November 1942 – 3 January 1943
 Navarin Airfield, Algeria, 16 March 1943

 Oudna Airfield, Tunisia, 4 August 1943
 Tortorella Airfield, Italy, c. 13 December 1943
 Marcianise Airfield, Italy, c. 27 October – 8 November 1945
 Birmingham Municipal Airport, Alabama, 29 May 1947 – 27 June 1949
 Fairchild Air Force Base, Washington, 1 January 1953
 Westover Air Force Base, Massachusetts, 4 September 1956 – 30 September 1973
 Grand Forks Air Force Base, North Dakota, 11 September 2011 – present

Aircraft
 Boeing B-17 Flying Fortress, 1942–1945
 Convair RB-36 Peacemaker, 1953–1956
 Convair B-36 Peacemaker, 1953–1956
 Boeing B-52 Stratofortress, 1956–1973
 Northrop Grumman RQ-4 Global Hawk, 2011–present

See also

 Boeing B-17 Flying Fortress Units of the Mediterranean Theater of Operations
 List of B-52 Units of the United States Air Force

References
 Notes

 Citations

Bibliography

 
 
 
 

Reconnaissance squadrons of the United States Air Force